Sarkal or Sar Kal may refer to:
 Sarkal, Marivan
 Sarkal, Qorveh
 Sar Kal, Saqqez
 Sarkal Rural District, in Marivan County